The Virginia Tech Hokies baseball team represents Virginia Polytechnic Institute and State University (Virginia Tech) in NCAA Division I college baseball.  Established in 1895, the team participates in the Coastal division of the Atlantic Coast Conference and plays its home games at English Field. The team's current head coach is John Szefc.

Coaching records

Virginia Tech in the NCAA Tournament

MLB alumni

Joe Saunders
Wyatt Toregas
Brian Fitzgerald
Kevin Barker
Brad Clontz
Mike Williams
George Canale
Franklin Stubbs
Johnny Oates
Leo Burke
Toby Atwell
Cloy Mattox
Buddy Dear
Chad Pinder
Wally Shaner

References

External links